Aenie Wong (born 2 August 1984) is a Malaysian television actress. She has been nominated for three Golden Awards.

TV films

Television

Movie

Awards / Finalist

External links
 Aenie Wong

Malaysian television actresses
Malaysian people of Chinese descent
Living people
1984 births
21st-century Malaysian actresses